The 69 Eyes are a Finnish rock band. It was founded in 1989 in Helsinki by vocalist Jyrki 69 (who also writes the band's lyrics), guitarists Bazie, Timo-Timo and bassist Archzie, joined in 1992 by drummer Jussi 69; the lineup never changed since then. The 69 Eyes music blends gothic rock with glam metal and rock 'n' roll in a style that was dubbed "goth'n'roll".

The 69 Eyes is currently signed to EMI Finland. The band's albums are now distributed worldwide; The End Records acts as the band's official North American distributor, as Nuclear Blast Records provides distribution in Europe. Australia will be handled by AmpHead Music. All Asian and Latin American releases are handled by EMI affiliates.

Band history
Formed in the bars of Helsinki, Finland in the summer of 1989 by Jyrki 69, Archzie (formerly of Syyskuu), Timo-Timo, Lotto and Bazie, The 69 Eyes originally had a glam metal style and were compared to other Finnish glam metal acts such as Smack and Hanoi Rocks.
The band's lineup has stayed the same since 1992 when drummer Jussi 69 replaced original drummer Lotto who had played on the band's first two 7" vinyl singles.

The band released their first 7" EP, "Sugarman", in 1990, followed by another 7", "Barbarella" in 1991. These are the only two releases that do not feature Jussi. These releases paved the way for the band's first album Bump 'n' Grind released in 1992 which contained some re-recorded versions of songs from the first two EPs. This same year, the band released their final two 7" EPs, titled "Juicy Lucy" and "High Times Low Lives".

The band's second CD "Motor City Resurrection" was released in 1994 via Japanese Label 1+2 Records. It has since been re-released with eight bonus tracks worldwide. Though not a full-length release, but rather a compilation album (much like Hanoi Rocks' Self Destruction Blues), it collected the majority of the band's early material and contributions to other compilations.
It was followed in 1995 by Savage Garden which featured Hanoi Rocks guitarist Andy McCoy on the track "Wild Talk".
Also released during this time were two VHS tapes "Motor City Resurrection" and "Savage Tales" available only through the band's self-run fan club (the aptly titled "Get Down to 69") which are seen rarely, if ever for sale online.

1997 saw the release of Wrap Your Troubles in Dreams, which fans generally mark as the last 69 Eyes "glam-era" album. The title track of this album was re-recorded for the Angels album 10 years later.
The goth rock infused Wasting the Dawn was released in 1999 and was considered a milestone success for the band. The CD was released internationally on Roadrunner Records and marked the band's major label debut. The album's hit single, the title track Wasting the Dawn lyrically paid tribute to The Doors' Jim Morrison and was released as a digipack CD single. Jyrki 69 developed a concept video for this track which featured long-time friend and collaborator HIM member Ville Valo posing at a snowy cemetery as the ghost of Jim Morrison. This video was released on DVD in Finland with a bonus behind the scenes feature and marked first ever music DVD released in the country.
Both the video and feature were later added as extras on 2003's Helsinki Vampires DVD.

In early 2000, the band began working with producer Johnny Lee Michaels in Helsinki who would helm the band's next four albums, and contribute to the fifth.
Spring brought the single Gothic Girl which spent months on the Singles Top 10 and on Finnish nation radio playlists. It became the band's first gold record. This single was a precursor to the sixth album, released in September 2000, Blessed Be which rose to number 4 on the Finnish Album Charts and stayed in the top 10 for over a month. The album spawned four singles, the aforementioned Gothic Girl, Brandon Lee, The Chair and Stolen Season. Videos were filmed for the first three singles. After the release of Blessed Be, the band did their first short tour in Germany which included a show at the M'era Luna Festival. Support for the tour was Norwegian rock band Zeromancer.

In 2002 the band released Paris Kills, which would be known as their breakthrough album. It stayed for weeks as number 1 in Finland and went gold in a month of its release. It has since gone platinum. In Germany it rose to number 35 in the first week. After touring Europe and Finland for months, a sold-out show at Helsinki's famous Tavastia Club was filmed and documented in November 2002 for use in the "Helsinki Vampires" DVD.

At the end of 2003, The 69 Eyes signed to EMI Finland as they geared up to record Devils. The "Lost Boys" single was released in Finland at this time, paying homage to the film of the same name as anticipation for the full-length album grew.
2004 saw the release of Devils, their 8th album, to which they toured the UK in support of Wednesday 13. Once again the album was a success in their native Finland. It became the band's fourth album to reach gold status and the second to reach number one position on the Finnish TOP 40 album charts. It was Released in Finland in October 2004 and in October 2005 in the U.S. through 456 Entertainment.

In 2005, The 69 Eyes played nearly one hundred shows around the world in fifteen countries, from Mexico to Japan. Devils was also released in the U.S. with an alternate cover from the international release. The band filmed their video "Lost Boys" in Hollywood and the Philadelphia area, directed by MTV star Bam Margera.

In March 2006, The 69 Eyes briefly toured the U.S. for the first time with Program The Dead & Damone, performing live on Last Call with Carson Daly.Episode dated 31 March 2006 This marked the band's first ever U.S. television appearance.

Angels, the sequel to the 2004 album Devils, was released in Europe in March 2007. It debuted at number 1 in Finland and has since gone gold. Shortly after their tour with Cradle of Filth and 3 Inches of Blood, Angels was released on 25 June 2007 in the UK. The first single from the album was "Perfect Skin" which went straight to number 1 on the Finnish singles chart. The second single was "Never Say Die". Videos were filmed for both singles and received international airplay.

The band did a summer 2007 US tour with Wednesday 13, Night Kills The Day, & Fair to Midland, and supported Within Temptation on tour in the UK in November. They played 125 shows worldwide in 2007.

In 2008 the band released their first live album, titled The 69 Eyes: Hollywood Kills. It featured a complete live show recorded at the Whisky a Go Go in West Hollywood in March 2006. The performance featured hits spanning the six latest albums an introduction by Bam Margera and a live cover of the Ramones' "I Just Wanna Have Something to Do". The concert was also filmed in its entirety. Five tracks from the performance were released on DVD as bonus content on the Angels/Devils box set and the entire concert was released on the "Back in Blood" bonus DVD.

The band began 2009 by touring in Europe as a part of Hellhounds Festival with Tiamat and Ava Inferi. In early 2009, The band started initial recording for their ninth studio album with Grammy award-winning producer Matt Hyde. The recording process took place in Los Angeles. It was also revealed that Johnny Lee Michaels provided post-production work in Helsinki.
The new album Back in Blood was released 28 August in Europe and 15 September in the USA. In early June 2009, Bam Margera directed the music video for the first single from the album, "Dead Girls Are Easy." The video premiered on playboy.com on 17 July 2009. The 69 Eyes also toured Australia for the first time in mid-June, playing in Brisbane, Melbourne, and Sydney. A tour of the United States followed in October 2009, and Jyrki 69 was featured on both FOX New's "Red Eye" program, and CNN International also. In December 2009, the band debuted their newest video for the song, "Dead & Gone" via Myspace. This new video marked the band's third collaboration with Bam Margera. On 10 August the band revealed a contest for fans to create a video for the next single "Kiss Me Undead". The response was overwhelming, and on 30 September the band posted their 14 favorite videos on their YouTube page.

In April 2010, during an interview with Sean Twisted of Renegaderadio.net, Rudi Protrudi, frontman & founder of The Fuzztones, reported he had completed work on new song with The 69 Eyes, although further details were unavailable during that time.

On the official The 69 Eyes webpage they reported a European tour with Hardcore Superstar and Crashdïet in March and April 2011.

Early in 2012, The 69 Eyes began recording their next studio album X. X was released on 28 September 2012, across Europe and on 9 October 2012, in the United States. The first single from the album was "Red" and featured a music video. The second single was "Borderline". Both singles were available before the album was released in Europe. In February 2013, the band released the singles "Love Runs Away" and "Tonight" simultaneously via iTunes. "Tonight" was released exclusively in Finland while "Love Runs Away" was released everywhere else. Both singles included two previously unreleased tracks, "Rosary Blue" and "Dracula's Castle", the latter being the song Rudi Protrudi reported he had co-written with The 69 Eyes back in 2010.

The 69 Eyes released a double-CD compilation of their radio hit singles called "The Best of Helsinki Vampires" on 1 November 2013. The compilation also included a brand-new single "Lost Without Love".

On 29 July 2015, the band announced that they were working on a new album with producer Johnny Lee Michaels in Helsinki. Johnny Lee Michaels previously worked with the band on four consecutive albums (Blessed Be, Paris Kills, Devils, Angels) The new album was set to be released in early 2016. They also announced the first single "Jet Fighter Plane" to be released on 15 January 2016. The second single "Dolce Vita" was released on 8 April 2016. Both singles had music videos directed by Ville Juurikkala. The album titled Universal Monsters was released on 22 April 2016. The third single was announced to be "Jerusalem" and was released with a music video on 13 May 2016.

On 17 April 2019, the band began their first tour in the United States since 2009, ahead of the release of their upcoming album. The tour ends on 18 May in Philadelphia, making them the last national act scheduled to play at The Trocadero prior to its closure.

On 25 May 2019, The 69 Eyes announced they were to release their twelfth studio album on Friday the 13th of September 2019 via Nuclear Blast. Jyrki 69 gave a few details about the new record, saying "I feel like this planet is on some turning point. The end of the western world is near and the question is: What is happening when the west ends..? The title has multiple meanings for us… but be assured it has definitely nothing to do with The Pet Shop Boys or London."

"The track deals with the idea of Hollywood and everyone coming there to make their dreams come true, but it's very seldom that they succeed and this is something you can see there everywhere", Jyrki 69 contemplates. "It's a place that makes you desperate and I wanted to get these dark vibes into the song. But on the other hand the track is also a celebration of life – we should be excited to be here and everybody's a legend and they should realise that we should enjoy what we do instead of worry what other people think."

The 69 Eyes also released a behind-the-scenes video showing the recording of the record.

In February 2022, The 69 Eyes announced that they had signed to Atomic Fire Records, and two months later, they released their first song in three years "Drive". The band also plans to release a new album in 2023.

Music style

Initially, The 69 Eyes' music style was of glam metal influenced by acts such as Mötley Crüe and Hanoi Rocks. However, they began to incorporate more influence from gothic rock bands such as The Mission, The Cult, The Sisters of Mercy and The Lords of the New Church. Their sound was described as a mix of the gloominess of gothic rock with guitar-powered rock 'n' roll. Their music continued to show further influence from other rock artists such as The Doors, Elvis Presley, and Billy Idol as well as vampire films and literature. The term "goth 'n roll" is used by fans to describe their style. They are often described as a dark rock band, a term which the band has embraced. In recent times, with the release of Back in Blood, they have moved back to a more guitar-based sound, although gothic imagery and lyrical themes remain forefront in their style.

Discography

Bump 'n' Grind (1992)
Motor City Resurrection (1994) (compilation)
Savage Garden (1995)
Wrap Your Troubles in Dreams (1997)
Wasting the Dawn (1999)
Blessed Be (2000)
Paris Kills (2002)
Devils (2004)
Angels (2007)
Back in Blood (2009)
X (2012)
Universal Monsters (2016)
West End (2019)
Death Of Darkness (2023)

Members
 Jyrki 69 (Jyrki Pekka Emil Linnankivi) – lead vocals
 Bazie (Pasi Moilanen) – lead guitar, backing vocals
 Timo-Timo (Timo Tapio Pitkänen) – rhythm guitar
 Archzie (Arto Väinö Ensio Ojajärvi) – bass, backing vocals
 Jussi 69 (Jussi Heikki Tapio Vuori) – drums

References

External links
 

Caroline Records artists
Finnish glam metal musical groups
Finnish gothic rock groups
Finnish gothic metal musical groups
69 Eyes, The
Musical groups established in 1989
Musical quintets
Nuclear Blast artists
Virgin Records artists